Events from the year 1964 in Iran.

Incumbents
 Shah: Mohammad Reza Pahlavi 
 Prime Minister: Asadollah Alam (until March 7), Hassan-Ali Mansur (starting March 7)

Deaths
 13 July – Death of Hossein Ala'.

References

 
Iran
Years of the 20th century in Iran
1960s in Iran
Iran